Shaw v. Murphy, 532 U.S. 223 (2001), is a decision of the United States Supreme Court rejecting the First Amendment right of prisoners to provide legal assistance to other prisoners.

Background 
While incarcerated, Murphy learned that a fellow prisoner was charged with assaulting a correctional officer. Murphy authored a letter to the accused prisoner offering legal assistance in his defense. The letter was intercepted pursuant to prison regulations and was reviewed, at which point Murphy was sanctioned for violating the prison's rule against interference in due process hearing.

Procedural history
Murphy sought declaratory and injunctive relief from the district court, which applied the Supreme Court precedent from Turner v. Safley, and ruled against the petitioner. On appeal, the Ninth Circuit reversed the decision. The Supreme Court granted certiorari.

Opinion of the Court 
Writing for a unanimous Court, Justice Clarence Thomas found that the district court had correctly applied the Turner standard, which upheld regulatory impingements on the constitutional rights of prisoners where the regulation is reasonably related to a legitimate penological interest. Under Turner, prisoner communication may be monitored and regulated, and the content of the communication (i.e., the legal advice) makes no difference in the assessment of the legality of the regulation.

Ginsburg's concurrence 
Justice Ruth Bader Ginsburg noted in her concurrence that the respondent argued on appeal before the Ninth Circuit that the regulation under which he was charged was vague and overbroad. Because the Ninth Circuit did not rule on the merits of that argument, Ginsburg argued that the remand for which the Court provided should not impede Murphy's ability to raise the issue of vagueness and overbreadth again.

References

External links
 

United States Free Speech Clause case law
United States Supreme Court cases
United States Supreme Court cases of the Rehnquist Court
2001 in United States case law